USS Higgins (DDG-76) is a United States Navy  (Flight II).  Higgins is the 26th ship of her class, and the 15th of the class to be built by Bath Iron Works of Bath, Maine. Construction began on 14 November 1996 and she was launched and christened on 4 October 1997. She was commissioned at a ceremony in Port Everglades, Florida on 24 April 1999. She is part of Destroyer Squadron 15 within the Seventh Fleet, and is homeported at United States Fleet Activities Yokosuka in Yokosuka, Japan.

Namesake
She is named for William R. Higgins, a Colonel in the U.S. Marine Corps, who was captured, tortured and murdered in 1988 by Hezbollah, during a UN peacekeeping mission to Lebanon. In 1992 he was posthumously awarded the Presidential Citizens Medal, and two years later it was announced that a ship would be named in his honor.

History

Higgins was built by Bath Iron Works in Bath, Maine. The ship was christened on 1 October 1997 by the wife of Colonel Higgins, Lieutenant Colonel Robin L. Higgins, USMC (retired), who is also the ship's sponsor. "In the name of all that is good and right in the world - Semper Fi - Always Faithful - I christen thee HIGGINS".

Higgins was the first ship off the coast for the Hainan Island incident that occurred on 1 April 2001, when a United States Navy EP-3E ARIES II signals intelligence aircraft and a People's Liberation Army Navy (PLAN) J-8II interceptor fighter jet collided in mid-air, resulting in an international dispute between the United States and the People's Republic of China on her maiden deployment.

Upon returning to San Diego in April 2004, Higgins completed a safe and efficient ordnance offload and fuel transfer and headed into a nine week Selected Restricted Availability. This time in the shipyard enhanced Higgins capabilities including the installation of the Tactical Tomahawk weapons system, the refurbishment of the Mk 45/5-inch Lightweight Gun Mount and Mk 41 Vertical Launch systems, and an enhanced Combat Systems suite. December 2004 marked the beginning of a busy upcoming year for Higgins. She became a member of the  Carrier Strike Group, in the company of Nimitz,  the cruiser , the destroyer , and the submarine . In the three-week Composite Unit Exercise that followed, Higgins stood out in all mission areas and, along with the other ships in the Nimitz Strike Group, was now certified "surge ready" to deploy.

In February 2005, the ship conducted the Congressionally-mandated inspection by the Board of Inspection and Survey (INSURV). This complete material assessment of the ship was successfully completed and was highlighted by a one-day underway demonstration which showcased Higgins high levels of combat readiness with near-perfect grades in nearly every category. The next pre-deployment milestone consisted of Higgins ordnance onload at Naval Weapons Station Seal Beach. Once the ship was outfitted with her deployment load of ammunition, Higgins was once again underway with the Nimitz Strike Group in March for a Joint Task Force Exercise. Coincident with that two-week exercise, Higgins sent three teams to the recently instituted Non-Compliant Visit, Board, Search, and Seizure school and, as a result, became one of the first ships to deploy to the Fifth Fleet AOR with an organic non-compliant boarding capability, greatly enhancing her effectiveness in waging the Global War on Terrorism.

With only thirteen months since the previous deployment, Higgins commenced a second deployment on 6 May 2005 in company with the Nimitz Strike Group. A brief stop at the North Island Naval Weapons Station provided Higgins with several new combat capabilities, particularly the new Tactical Tomahawk Cruise Missiles and the High Explosive Electronically Timed (HE-ET) and Kinetic Energy Electronically Timed (KE-ET) 5-inch projectiles. While the TACTOM missiles significantly enhance Higgins Strike warfare capabilities, the HE-ET and KE-ET rounds provide the ship more capable defense against an asymmetric surface threat.

In the second half of January 2006, Higgins conducted Mobility-Navigation and Seamanship (MOB-N and MOB-S) training while transiting to Puerto Vallarta for a three-day port visit. February and March saw various phases of the pre-deployment training cycle, including exercises or assessments in Anti-Terrorism and Force Protection, Engineering, Combat Systems Training Team capabilities, Supply and Medical Readiness, Damage Control, and Search and Rescue. In April 2006, Higgins offloaded ammo in Seal Beach and completed a Mobility-Engineering (MOB-E) assessment in preparation for the ensuing Selected Restricted Availability (SRA) period, which brought with it many equipment upgrades that enhanced Higgins warfare capabilities. In August 2006, Higgins returned to Naval Station San Diego from the shipyard and kicked off the pre-deployment "workups", which included various inport scenarios involving Damage Control, Naval Surface Fire Support (NSFS), Ballistic Missile Defense (BMD), Undersea Warfare (USW), and Strike Warfare (STW). Later in the month, Higgins returned to Seal Beach to take on weapons required for the following year's deployment.

The ship performed logistical support for United States Coast Guard helicopters undergoing relief operations for the 2010 Haiti earthquake.

On 14 April 2018, she fired 23 Tomahawk missiles from a position in the north Persian Gulf as part of a bombing campaign in retaliation for the Syrian government's use of chemical weapons against people in Douma. On 27 May 2018, she, alongside the guided missile cruiser  patrolled the  zone surrounding the Paracel Islands in the South China Sea, which Vietnam has claimed as its territory, in an act to ensure freedom of navigation. Some say the patrol was in response to the deployment of H6-K bombers by the People's Liberation Army Air Force. That act was considered by the Pentagon to be an act of aggression, leading to rising tensions in the area.

On 20 September 2022, Higgins, alongside the Canadian frigate  transited the Taiwan Strait.

Deployments

 Maiden deployment – November 2000–May 2001 Western Pacific/Persian Gulf 
 Sea swap deployment – November 2002–April 2004 Western Pacific/Persian Gulf.
 November 2017–21 June 2018 Western Pacific.
 Forward deployment – August 2021 - TBD Yokosuka, Japan

Awards
 Coast Guard Meritorious Unit Commendation with Operational Distinguishing Device (1997-1999)
 Navy Unit Commendation (Jan-May 2003, Aug-Dec 2015)
 Navy Meritorious Unit Commendation (Dec 2000-Mar 2001) HARRY S TRUMAN BATTLE GROUP
 Battle "E" - (2003, 2021)
 Humanitarian Service Medal (14-25 Jan 2010) 2010 Haiti earthquake
 James F. Chezek Memorial Gunnery Award (1999, 2001)

Coat of arms

Shield 
The shield has background of blue with a "V" cutting through the center. The griffin is shown in the "V" wielding an axe and a trident.
The traditional Navy colors were chosen for the shield because dark blue, white and gold respectively represent the sea, integrity and excellence. The griffin, holding an axe and a trident, denotes valor and intelligence. The axe indicates her ability and readiness for engaging land based hostilities, while the trident symbolizes her modern weapon systems, giving her air combat and undersea engagement versatility. The "V" of the shield represents victory and the clover leaf is for good fortune.

Crest 
The crest consists of an anchor with swords crossing in the middle, both surrounded by wreaths.
The anchor is representative of the U.S. Navy. Two wreaths, one behind and one surrounding the anchor, symbolize the military and civilian honors awarded to Colonel Higgins for some unusual achievements. Crossed swords, a Naval officer's sword and a Marine Corps Mameluke, represent the long-standing tradition of Navy and Marine Corps cooperation in times of peace and war.

Motto 
The motto is written on a scroll of gold that has a blue reverse side.
The ships motto is "First to Fight". The motto is a reference to the honorable feats of Colonel Higgins and is part of The "Marines" Hymn.

Seal 
The coat of arms in full color as in the blazon, upon a white background enclosed within a dark blue oval border edged on the outside with a gold rope and bearing the inscription "USS HIGGINS" at the top and "DDG 76" in the base all gold.

References

External links

 Official site
 
  USS Higgins Commanding Officer Relieved. Story Number: NNS070508-04. 8 May 2007
 http://www.history.navy.mil/shiphist/h/ddg76.htm - 1999 and 2000 Command History Reports for Higgins

 

Arleigh Burke-class destroyers
Destroyers of the United States
Ships built in Bath, Maine
1997 ships
2010 Haiti earthquake relief
Carrier Strike Group One